This is a list of crowd figures for 2005 Australian football codes.  Specifically, they include home matches in the following seasons:

The 2005 Australian Football League season
The 2005 National Rugby League season
The 2005–06 A-League season
The 2005 Super 12 season

Attendances by League
Some codes have multiple competitions, several competitions are compared here.

Only matches and competitions specifically controlled and sanctioned by each league are counted; matches such as inter-club trial matches are not counted.

Attendances by Team
Total home attendances for domestic league competitions are listed here.

Teams are listed by competition – tournament and league competitions that are more than one game in length are taken into consideration.
Super 12 clubs have been excluded due to lack of figures.

2005 Matches

|- bgcolor="#CCCCFF"
| Crowd
| Home team
| Score
| Away team
| Score
| Ground
| League
| Round
|- bgcolor="#ffe4b5"
| 91,828
| Sydney
| 8.10.58
| West Coast
| 7.12.54
| MCG
| AFL
| Grand Final
|- bgcolor="#b0c4de"
| 82,453
| Wests Tigers
| 30
| North Queensland Cowboys
| 16
| Stadium Australia
| NRL
| Grand Final
|- bgcolor="#ffe4b5"
| 73,344
| St Kilda
| 9.11.65
| Sydney
| 15.3.93
| MCG
| AFL
| Preliminary Final
|- bgcolor="#ffe4b5"
| 70,033
| Essendon
| 11.17.83
| Collingwood
| 10.9.69
| MCG
| AFL
| 5
|- bgcolor="#ffe4b5"
| 65,018
| Geelong
| 18.8.116
| Melbourne
| 9.7.61
| MCG
| AFL
| Qualifying Final
|- bgcolor="#ffe4b5"
| 55,016
| Essendon
| 12.13.85
| Melbourne
| 13.17.95
| MCG
| AFL
| 22
|- bgcolor="#ffe4b5"
| 48,768
| Adelaide
| 18.15.123
| Port Adelaide
| 5.10.40
| AAMI Stadium
| AFL
| Semi Final
|- bgcolor="#ffe4b5"
| 48,768
| Adelaide
| 8.7.57
| St.kilda
| 10.5.65
| AAMI Stadium
| AFL
| Qualifying Final
|- bgcolor="#ffe4b5"
| 43,302
| West Coast
| 10.9.69
| Sydney
| 10.5.65
| Subiaco Oval
| AFL
| Qualifying Final
|- bgcolor="#ffe4b5"
| 43,044
| West Coast
| 10.14 (74)
| Adelaide
| 12.10 (82)
| Subiaco Oval
| AFL
| 22
|- bgcolor="#ffe4b5"
| 43,009
| West Coast
| 14.9.93
| Adelaide 
| 11.11.77
| Subiaco Oval
| AFL
| Preliminary Final

Notes

External links
 Official Website of the Australian Football League
 National Rugby League
 Hyundai A-League 2005-06 season

2005 in Australian rugby league
2005 in Australian rugby union
2005 in Australian soccer
2005 in Australian rules football
2005